Decades Apart is a 2-CD career spanning compilation album by English rock band the Stranglers, released on 1 March 2010 by EMI. It features 35 singles and album tracks from 1977 to 2006, as well as two new tracks, "Retro Rockets" and "I Don't See the World Like You Do". The album reached #146 in the UK Albums Chart.

Critical reception

James Allen, writing for AllMusic, said, "The latter-day cuts basically alternate between classy but vague, '80s-indebted alt-rock and more visceral tracks harking back to the Stranglers' early sound ... and the fact remains that the first disc's impact vastly outweighs that of the second. Still, this is as thorough a Stranglers history as one could want, and the Burnel-led lineup comes off much better than some might expect." Both Martin Hutchinson of The Bolton News and Ian D. Hall of Liverpool Sound and Vision called it the definitive Stranglers' compilation.

Track listing

Charts

Personnel
See individual albums for full personnel credits.
The Stranglers
 Jean-Jacques Burnel –  bass, vocals 
 Dave Greenfield – keyboards 
 Jet Black – drums 
 Hugh Cornwell – guitar, vocals (disc 1 / disc 2: 1-4)
 Paul Roberts – vocals (disc 2: 5-14)
 John Ellis – guitar (disc 2: 5-11)
 Baz Warne – guitar, vocals (disc 1: 1 / disc 2: 12-17)
Technical
 Martin Rushent – production (disc 1: 2-9) 
 Alan Winstanley – production (disc 1: 10, 11 / disc 2: 8, 9) 
 The Stranglers – production (disc 1: 10-17 / disc 2: 1-3, 8-11) 
 Steve Churchyard – production (disc 1: 13-16)
 Laurie Latham – production (disc 1: 17, 18)
 Mike Kemp – production (disc 2: 1, 2, 5-7) 
 Ted Hayton – production (disc 2: 3)
 Roy Thomas Baker – production (disc 2: 4)
 Andy Gill – production (disc 2: 10)
 Cenzo Townsend – additional production (disc 2: 10)
 David M. Allen – production (disc 2: 11)
 Mark Wallis – production (disc 2: 12-14)
 Pete Glenister – production (disc 2: 12) 
 David Ruffy – production (disc 2: 13, 14) 
 Louie Nicastro – production (disc 2: 15, 16)  
 John McMurtrie – photography
 Phil Johnson – sleeve design, concepts
 Owen Carne – liner notes

References

External links
Decades Apart on Discogs

The Stranglers compilation albums
2010 compilation albums
EMI Records compilation albums
Albums produced by Martin Rushent
Albums produced by Alan Winstanley
Albums produced by Laurie Latham
Albums produced by Roy Thomas Baker
Albums produced by Andy Gill
Albums produced by David M. Allen